If I Could may refer to:
If I Could (album), 1993 album by jazz saxophonist Stanley Turrentine
If I Could (EP), by 24-7 Spyz
"If I Could" (1927 song), a song by 1927 from the album ...Ish
"If I Could" (24-7 Spyz song), from the EP If I Could
"If I Could" (Calaisa song), a 2008 Calaisa song
"If I Could" (Wiley song), by Wiley featuring Ed Sheeran
""El Condor Pasa (If I Could)" a version by Simon & Garfunkel of a song written by Daniel Alomía Robles
"If I Could", a song by Lou Barlow from the album Emoh
"If I Could", a song by Regina Belle from the album Passion
"If I Could", a song by Blue Merle from Burning In The Sun
"If I Could", a song written by Tim Carroll, on John Prine's Live on Tour album
"If I Could", a song by Cheap Trick from the album Special One
"If I Could", a song by Daddy X from the album Family Ties
"If I Could", a song by Darius Danesh from the album Live Twice
"If I Could", a song by DJ Tatana from the album Peace and Love
"If I Could", a song by Erasure from the album The Circus
"If I Could", a single by David Essex from Greatest Hits (David Essex album)
"If I Could", a song by Five Americans from the album Western Union
"If I Could", a song by Gabrielle from the album Gabrielle
"If I Could", a song by Peter Hammill from the album The Future Now
"If I Could", a song written by Ken Hirsch, Ron Miller and Marti Sharron
"If I Could", a single by Hometown News from Hometown News 2004
"If I Could", a song by Hundred Reasons from the album Ideas Above Our Station
"If I Could", a single by Joée from Truth 1998 
"If I Could", a song by Jack Johnson from the album In Between Dreams
"If I Could", a song by Just a Band from the album Scratch to Reveal
"If I Could", a song by Gordon Lightfoot from the album Back Here on Earth
"If I Could", a song by Mineral from the album The Power of Failing
"If I Could", a song by Phish from the album Hoist
"If I Could", a song by Project Pitchfork from the album Dream, Tiresias!
"If I Could", a song by Seal from the album Seal (1994 album)
"If I Could", a song by State of Shock from the album Guilty by Association
"If I Could", a song by Stellar from the album Magic Line
"If I Could", a song by Tech N9ne from the album All 6's and 7's
"If I Could", a song by The Yeah You's from the album Looking Through You
"Andai Aku Bisa" ("If I Could"), a song by Chrisye from the album Konser Tur 2001
"Eh Da Mozam" ("If I Could"), a song by Lambe Alabakoski
"If I Could (What I Would Do)", a song by Vanessa Daou from the album Slow to Burn